The VT-1 reactor was the nuclear fission reactor used in a pair to power the  as part of the Soviet Navy's Project 645 Кит-ЖМТ. It is a liquid metal cooled reactor (LMR), using highly enriched uranium-235 fuel to produce 73 MW of power.

K-27 was a  first generation nuclear submarine, and the only one of its class fitted with liquid metal cooled reactors. However the seven-member  were subsequently fitted with liquid metal cooled reactors.

It was developed by OKB Gidropress in cooperation with IPPE.

See also
 United States Naval reactors
 Naval Reactors

Soviet naval reactors
Liquid metal fast reactors